Hendrika Cornelia Scott (Henda) Swart FRSSAf (born 1939, died February 2016 [age 77-78]) was a South African mathematician, a professor emeritus of mathematics at the University of KwaZulu-Natal and a professor at the University of Cape Town

Personal life 
Born Hendrika Cornelia Scott she married John Henry Swart. They had three children Christine, Sandra and Gustav.

Career 
Swart began teaching at the University of Natal in 1962. She was the first person to earn a doctorate in mathematics from Stellenbosch University, in 1971, with a dissertation on the geometry of projective planes supervised by Kurt-Rüdiger Kannenberg. In 1977, her research interests shifted from geometry to graph theory, which she continued to publish in for the rest of her career.

She was the editor-in-chief of the journal Utilitas Mathematica, and was vice president of the Institute of Combinatorics and its Applications. In 1996 she became a fellow of the Royal Society of South Africa.

Swart was a part-time lecturer at the University of Cape town from 2014 until her death.

Publications 
She published under the name Henda C Swart. She published nearly 100 papers from 1980 to 2018.

References

External links

1939 births
2016 deaths
20th-century South African mathematicians
South African mathematicians
Graph theorists
Stellenbosch University alumni
University of KwaZulu-Natal
21st-century South African mathematicians
20th-century women mathematicians
21st-century women mathematicians
Academic journal editors